This is a complete filmography of Carmen Miranda, a Portuguese-Brazilian singer, actress, and dancer.

By the mid-1930s, Carmen Miranda had become the most popular female singer in Brazil, and one of the nation's first film stars. In her lifetime she had appeared in six Brazilian films and fourteen US productions. The only glimpses that today's audiences can have of her Brazilian screen performances are in the recently restored Alô, Alô, Carnaval (1936) and a tantalisingly brief clip from Banana da Terra (1939), in which she first wore on screen what would become her iconic baiana costume and extravagant turban.

In 1939 she became a star on Broadway, at the invitation of US show business impresario, Lee Shubert, and just two years later was under contract with the 20th Century-Fox studios in Hollywood. Her most memorable performances are in the musical numbers of films such as Down Argentine Way (1940), Week-End in Havana (1941), That Night in Rio (1941) and The Gang's All Here (1943).

After World War II, Miranda's films at 20th Century Fox were made in black-and-white indicating her waning status at the studio. In 1946, she bought out her Fox contract for $75,000, she made the decision to pursue her acting career free of the constraints of the studios. In 1947, she starred an independent production for United Artists, Copacabana alongside Groucho Marx, with limited success.

She was the first Latin American to inscribe her name, handprints and footprints on the Walk of Fame outside Grauman's Chinese Theatre in Hollywood on 24 March 1941, and in 1944 she became the highest-paid woman in United States.

On August 4, 1955, Miranda filmed a number for The Jimmy Durante Show, during which she complained of being out of breath. In the early hours of the following morning, she died of a heart attack in the dressing room of her Beverly Hills mansion, collapsing to the floor, her hand still clutching a mirror.

Carmen Miranda became a Latin American icon and two of the films in which she appeared—Down Argentine Way and The Gang's All Here—have been added to the Library of Congress's National Film Registry.

Credits

Film appearances

Short subjects

Radio appearances

Television appearances

Stage work 
The Streets of Paris (1939–1940)
Sons o' Fun (1941–1942)

References

External links 
 

Miranda, Carmen